Oru Caribbean Udayippu is 2019 Malayalam drama film directed by A.Joji starring Rishi Prakash, Samuel Robinson, Vishnu Vinay, Aneesh G Menon, Megha Mathew, Mareena Michal, Niharika and Vishnu Govindan. The movie is about rivalry between two musical bands in a College.

Synopsis
The movie tells the story of 6 music enthusiastic youths from a village forms a music band in college. They develops a rivalry between other music band which is formed by their seniors.

Cast
Samuel Robinson
Rishi Prakash
Vishnu Vinay
Aneesh G Menon
Megha Mathew
Mareena Michal
Niharika 
Vishnu Govindan
Kochu Preman
Jassie Gift

References

2019 films
2010s Malayalam-language films
2019 drama films
Films shot in Kozhikode